Demi Vermeulen (born 9 April 1995) is a Dutch Paralympic equestrian.

Vermeulen competed at the 2016 Paralympic Games where she won a silver medal in the championship grade II event and a bronze medal in the team event, alongside Nicole den Dulk, Frank Hosmar and Rixt van der Horst.

References

1995 births
Living people
Paralympic silver medalists for the Netherlands
Paralympic bronze medalists for the Netherlands
Equestrians at the 2016 Summer Paralympics
Place of birth missing (living people)
Medalists at the 2016 Summer Paralympics
Paralympic medalists in equestrian
Paralympic equestrians of the Netherlands
20th-century Dutch women
21st-century Dutch women